The 2010 Oceania Sevens Championship was the third Oceania Sevens in men's rugby sevens. It was held at Larrakia Park (also known as Austar Rugby Park) in Darwin, Northern Territory, Australia.

Australia won the Oceania Sevens Championship by defeating Samoa 34 to 12. Tonga, PNG and the Cook Islands, as the three highest finishers excluding core teams Australia and Samoa, qualified for the Wellington and Adelaide legs of the 2010–11 IRB Sevens World Series. Tonga also qualified for the 2011 Hong Kong Sevens.

Pool Stage

Pool A

Pool B

Knockout stage

Plate

Cup

References

2010
2010 in Australian rugby union
2010 rugby sevens competitions
Sport in Darwin, Northern Territory
Rugby sevens competitions in Australia
2010s in the Northern Territory
International rugby union competitions hosted by Australia
2010 in Oceanian rugby union
October 2010 sports events in Australia